Jeff Lowe (September 13, 1950 - August 24, 2018) was a famed American alpinist from Ogden, Utah who was known for his visionary climbs and first ascents established in the US and Canadian Rockies, Alps and Himalayas. He was a proponent of the "Alpine style" philosophy of climbing, where small teams travel fast with minimal gear. Lowe made over 1000 first ascents.

Lowe was a co-founder of Lowe Alpine along with his brothers Greg Lowe and Mike Lowe. Jeff Lowe is the cousin of  George Henry Lowe III.

Lowe suffered from a neurological disease similar to ALS for approximately 18 years, until he died on August 24, 2018, in Colorado, USA.

Career achievements
Lowe is credited with bringing modern ice climbing to the United States from Europe as well as pushing the limits of  mixed climbing. He founded the companies Latok Mountain Gear and Cloudwalker. He introduced the world's first softshell jacket while at Latok Mountain Gear. Lowe was featured ice climbing on the cover of the December 11, 1978 issue of Sports Illustrated. Lowe worked for the Colorado Outward Bound School in his earlier years.

Lowe is credited with introducing ice climbing in the Winter X Games as well as starting the Ouray Ice Festival. He also was the organizer in Snowbird (Utah) in 1988, of the first international rock climbing competition ever held in the US.  Lowe received an Honorary Lifetime Membership in  the American Alpine Club, the club's highest honors, for his climbing achievements, contributions to the climbing community, and vision. He was also awarded Honorary Lifetime Membership in the Alpine Club of the United Kingdom.

Lowe is the subject of the Award Winning 2014 biographical documentary film Jeff Lowe's Metanoia Produced by Connie Self and Directed by Jim Aikman.

In 2017 he won the Piolets D'or Lifetime Achievement Award in France and was inducted into the Boulder Sports Hall of Fame in Colorado. Jeff was a beloved member of the climbing community both at home and abroad.

Notable ascents
1958 Grand Teton, Wyoming with father 
1971 Moonlight Buttress, Zion National Park, Utah, USA. FA with Mike Weis
1972 First Winter Ascent of Grand Teton's West Face with George Lowe
1973 North Face, Wetterhorn Peak (Colorado), San Juan Mountains, Colorado. FA with Paul Hogan
1973 Northeast Corner, Keeler Needle, Sierra Nevada, California USA; NCCS V F9 or F10 A2, FA with John Weiland
1974 Bridal Veil Falls, Telluride, Colorado, FA with Mike Weis;
1974 Green River Lake Dihedral, Squaretop, Wind River Range, Wyoming, USA - NCCS V F9, FA with Greg Lowe
1975 Mount Kitchener's Grand Central Couloir with Mike Weis
1979 Ama Dablam, Nepal solo
1980 Skyang Kangri - attempt
1982 Kwangde Ri's north face, Nepal with David Breashears
1985 Bird Brain Boulevard, Ouray, Colorado
1989 Tawoche, Northeast Face, Nepal with John Roskelley
1990 Trango (Nameless) Tower, Yugoslav route with Catherine Destivelle
1991 Metanoia, a new direct route on the Eiger's north face, that he opened solo and without bolts
1994 Octopussy, Vail, Colorado

His attempt on the north ridge of Latok I with Jim Donini, Michael Kennedy, and George Henry Lowe III in 1978 is considered by many to be the most difficult unfinished climb in the world.

Publications and instructional videos
The Ice Experience (1979)
Climbing (1986)

Waterfall Ice (1996)
Alpine Ice: Jeff Lowe's Climbing Techniques (1997)
Clean Walls (2004)

References

External links
"Jeff Lowe: The Genius"
Jeff Lowe biography at climbandmore.com 
"Last Night I Dreamed I Had Legs"
"Latok I, North Ridge, Attempt"

1950 births
2018 deaths
Ice climbers
American mountain climbers
American rock climbers
Sportspeople from Ogden, Utah
Piolet d'Or winners